Heze Shenhui (Chinese:菏泽神會/神会; Wade–Giles: Shen-hui; Japanese: Kataku Jinne, 684–758) was a Chinese Buddhist monk of the so-called "Southern School" of Zen, who "claimed to have studied under Huineng."

Shenhui is notable for his strident attacks on Yuquan Shenxiu and the associated "Northern School", which was the most prominent branch of Chan Buddhism in China at the time. He accused them of propagating gradual teachings, as opposed to his own sudden teachings.

Shenhui's own lineage, called the Heze lineage (菏泽宗), probably died out around the time of the Great Anti-Buddhist Persecution in 845, with Guifeng Zongmi being the only notable monk in the lineage.

Biography
Shenhui was born in Xiangyang with the surname Gao (高). He learned The Five Classics of Confucius and the philosophy of Laozi and Zhuangzi at a young age.

At the age of 14 he became a monk under Huineng, a disciple of Hongren and the founder of the Southern School of Zen. For a time Shenhui served as his attendant.

Several extant stories relate encounters between Huineng and Shenhui. In one, Huineng said to his students, 

In his writings and lectures Shenhui attacked what he called the "Northern School" of Zen. Despite his attacks on the Northern School, Shenhui traveled north to live amongst his ideological enemies in the capital city of Luoyang. While in the city he spoke publicly against the teachings of the Northern School.

Shenhui was a highly successful fundraiser for the government despite his criticism of Shenxiu for having governmental ties. During the An Lushan Rebellion, monks were asked to lecture, and sell certificates to the public in order to raise money for the counteroffensive. Shenhui was active in this endeavor in Luoyang, and reportedly very effective. Despite this, he was eventually banished from the city for stirring up trouble.

Shenhui was said to have died while meditating in 760. His burial stupa is located at Longmen Grottoes. One of his extant writings is Xianzongji (显宗记).

Attack on Shenxiu and the "Northern School"

Shenhui's attack
At the Great Dharma Assembly in Henan Province in 732 he coined this term in order to deride Shenxiu's school. Here he claimed that Shenxiu tried to usurp the title of Sixth Patriarch from Huineng. He supported his claims by stating that Huineng possessed the robe of Bodhidharma, the First Patriarch of Zen.

Another attack was staged at the Great Cloud Temple in Huatai in 734. He delivered a talk titled the Exposition on Right and Wrong in regards to Bodhidharma's Southern School. It was presented in the form of a discussion between him and a monk named Chongyuan, who took the side of Shenxiu's Northern School. Shenhui used the opportunity to question Shenxiu's legitimacy as Hongren's successor.

Most memorably, however, he accused the Northern School of advocating "gradual" and not "sudden" enlightenment.

The Record of the Zen Discourses of the Monk Shenhui quotes Shenhui:

In addition to these claims, Shenhui further alleged that Shenxiu's teachings deviated from Zen in their emphasis on ceremony and sutra study, rather than seated meditation and no-mind. He also accused "Northern School" students of trying to steal Bodhidharma's robe, to sever the head of Huineng's mummy, and to rewrite the inscription on Shenxiu's tomb with the words "Sixth Patriarch".

Historical analysis of Shenhui's attack
Several scholars consider Shenhui's arguments against the "Northern School" to be fabrications or exaggerations. Heinrich Dumoulin, commenting on Shenhui's accusations, wrote that Shenhui was "unscrupulous", while Ui Hakuju wrote that he had "“traits deserving of moral censure and criticism for intolerance”.

Scholars such as Philip Yampolsky have suggested that one of his disciples may have written the Platform Sutra, which glorifies Huineng and "sudden" enlightenment while deriding Shenxiu.

Scholars note that both the concept of a "patriarch" and the possession of the robe of Bodhidharma being the indicator of this person probably arose as a result of Shenhui's diatribes. In fact, according to the Platform Sutra, Huineng himself did not pass on the robe, nor did he name a "patriarch" to replace him. Rather, like his teacher Hongren, he had many disciples who went on to teach Zen.

Philip Yampolsky wrote that Shenhui's claim that the Diamond Sutra and not the Lankavatara Sutra was the paramount sutra of Bodhidharma and his disciples was "pure fabrication".

Influence
In the early 10th century, the founder of the Fayan School commented on Shenhui's lineage: 

Shenhui's own lineage, called the Heze school, probably died out around the time of the Great Anti-Buddhist Persecution in 845. His best-known descendant in this school was Guifeng Zongmi, who was also the fifth patriarch of the Huayan school. According to Tsung-mi, Shen-hui's approach was officially sanctioned in 796, when "an imperial commission determined that the Southern line of Ch'an represented the orthodox transmission and established Shen-hui as the seventh patriarch, placing an inscription to that effect in the shen-lung temple".

Shenhui's distinction between "gradual" versus "sudden" methods of enlightenment became a hallmark of Chinese Zen. Mazu Daoyi, whose Hongzhou school became the hallmark of Zen, was an early and important adopter of the "sudden" approach.

His speeches were found again in Dunhuang.

Notes

References

External links
 Vladimir K. (2005), Legends in Ch’an: the Northern/Southern Schools Split, Hui-neng and the Platform Sutra

Chan Buddhist monks
670 births
762 deaths